This is a list of Japanese football transfers in the winter transfer window 2018–19 by club.

J1 League

J2 League

J3 League

References 

2018–19
Transfers
Japan